Executive Suite is an American primetime soap opera which premiered on September 20, 1976. Loosely based on the 1954 film of the same name, it follows the personal and professional pressures of board members at the Cardway Corporation, a large conglomerate based in California.  The show was cancelled after five months, with its last episode airing on February 11, 1977.

Cast and characters

Executive Suite revolves around the power struggle between Don Walling (Mitchell Ryan), the board chairman of the company, and Howell Rutledge (Stephen Elliott), his chief rival and the company's hard-nosed senior vice president. Don is supported by his wife Helen (Sharon Acker), prodigal son Brian (Leigh McCloskey), who has recently returned from Europe, and daughter Stacey (Wendy Phillips), who is often involved in radical politics, to her family's dismay. Howell is assisted in his schemes by his equally conniving wife, Astrid (Gwyda Donhowe).

Other major characters include Hilary Madison (Madlyn Rhue), Cardway's only female board member and vice president of advertising, Mark Desmond (Richard Cox), head of consumer relations, members of the board Pearce Newberry (Byron Morrow), Malcolm Gibson (Percy Rodriguez) and Anderson Galt (William Smithers), Tom Dalessio (Paul Lambert), Brian's boss at the chemical plant, his daughter Glory (Joan Prather), who is having an affair with Andy Galt, Glory's black roommate Summer (Brenda Sykes), who becomes involved in an interracial romance with Brian, Mark's lover and former porn star Yvonne (Trisha Noble) and union rep Harry Ragin (Carl Weintraub).

Recurring characters include Yvonne's husband and porn producer Burt Holland (Lloyd Bochner), Cardway's business rival Sharon Coby (Joanna Barnes), her spy Nick Koslo (Scott Marlowe), who becomes involved with Hilary, Nick's son B.J. (Moosie Drier), lumber company owner Paul Duquesne (James Luisi), Sy Bookerman (John Randolph), Summer's brother Walter (Nat Jones), who disapproves of her relationship with Brian, Galt's wife Leona (Patricia Smith), who has a lesbian affair with Julie (Geraldine Brooks) that ends in tragedy, and theatre director David Valerio (Ricardo Montalban), who becomes involved with Helen.

Episodes

References

External links

1976 American television series debuts
1977 American television series endings
1970s American drama television series
English-language television shows
CBS original programming
Television shows set in Los Angeles
Television series by MGM Television

Live action television shows based on films